Lee Evans III (born March 11, 1981) is a former American football wide receiver in the National Football League (NFL). He was drafted by the Buffalo Bills in the first round (13th overall) of the 2004 NFL Draft and also played for the Baltimore Ravens. He played college football at Wisconsin.

As the highest drafted receiver for the Bills since Eric Moulds, Evans emerged as a dangerous deep threat for the team. He still ranks among the top five receivers in Bills history in terms of receptions, yards, and touchdowns, despite never making the Pro Bowl.

Early years
Born in Bedford, Ohio, Evans attended Bedford High School in Bedford, Ohio, a suburb located southeast of Cleveland.  Evans was also a high hurdler, with personal-bests of 13.59 seconds in the 110 metres hurdles and 37.32 seconds in the 300 metres hurdles.

College career

2000 season 
Evans caught 30 passes for 528 yards and 5 touchdowns in his freshman season at Wisconsin.

2001 season 
Lee Evans put together an incredible season despite having three different quarterbacks (Brooks Bollinger, Jim Sorgi, and Matt Schabert) during the year. Evans caught 75 passes for 1,545 yards (an average of 20.1 yards per reception) and 9 touchdowns.

2002 season 
Evans tore his ACL in the Spring Game and missed the entire season.

2003 season 
In Evans's last year at Wisconsin, the star receiver put together a season to remember for the Badgers. He caught 64 passes for 1,213 yards and 13 touchdowns. Possibly his finest game as a Badger came in a 56-21 blowout of the Michigan State Spartans: Evans caught 10 passes for 258 yards and 5 touchdowns.

Professional career

2004 NFL Draft
The Buffalo Bills selected Evans with the 13th overall pick in the first round of the 2004 NFL Draft. Lee was the first wide receiver since Eric Moulds in 1996 to be taken by the Bills in the first round.

Buffalo Bills
Evans was initially assigned the jersey number 84. Evans, as a reference to his full name, had always worn the number 3 in college, a number that was not allowed to be used in the National Football League for wide receivers. At that time, receivers and tight ends were only allowed to wear uniform numbers 80-89. Evans, in order to include the number 3 somewhere in his jersey number, instead chose 83, which required special permission; the Bills had set aside the number after the retirement of former Bills great Andre Reed.

The Bills' first-round draft pick moved into the starting lineup in his first season and emerged as one of the Bills' best players on offense. He caught 48 passes for 843 yards and 9 touchdowns as a rookie. The nine touchdowns remains a Bills rookie record.

During a game between the Bills and Miami Dolphins on December 4, 2005, Evans faced off against his former teammate on the Wisconsin Badgers, Chris Chambers. Evans set then career highs with receiving yards (117) and touchdowns (3), but Chambers set Miami franchise records for receptions (15) and receiving yards (238) as well as scoring the game-winning touchdown in the final seconds.

Evans quickly became a fan-favorite among Bills fans. After the departure of Eric Moulds, he established himself as the Bills' top receiver in 2006 with 82 receptions for 1,292 receiving yards and 8 touchdowns. He became a big ally for then starting quarterback J. P. Losman in the passing game, establishing himself as a deep threat at wide receiver. On November 19, 2006, in a game against the Houston Texans, he set the Buffalo Bills record for receiving yards in one quarter (205) and one game (265). He also became the first player in league history to record two 80-yard-plus touchdowns in one quarter when he caught two 83-yard touchdown passes in the first quarter.

In a 2007 game against the New York Jets, Evans wrestled a long pass away from Jets rookie cornerback Darrelle Revis, which resulted in an 85-yard touchdown reception to clinch the game for the Bills as they won 13–3.

Evans underwent minor shoulder surgery in the 2008 offseason. Coach Dick Jauron stated that the shoulder had been bothering Evans for the previous two years. The offseason surgery did not seem to slow Evans down in the 2008 season as he recorded his second 1,000 yards receiving season with 63 receptions, 1,017 yards, and three touchdowns, including an 87-yard score from Losman, who had since been relegated to the backup for Trent Edwards. Despite his strong play the Bills missed the postseason at 7-9. The next two seasons were less successful for Evans, as his yardage and touchdown count regressed both years with Terrell Owens and later Stevie Johnson taking over Evans' role as Buffalo's top receiver.

On December 12, 2010, Evans injured his ankle against the Cleveland Browns and was placed on injured reserve, which would be the last time he suited up for the Bills. Evans finished his Buffalo career with the third most receiving yards (5,934) and touchdowns (43) in franchise history, in addition to the fourth most receptions (377), which included six passes that each went for more than 70 yards.

Baltimore Ravens
On August 12, 2011, Evans was traded to the Baltimore Ravens for a 4th round pick in the 2012 NFL Draft. He missed a fair amount of the season with injuries. Evans played in 9 games, and finished the season with four receptions for 74 yards. In the AFC Championship Game, a pass was thrown to Evans in the end zone that if caught, would have likely secured a trip to the Super Bowl for the Ravens. The football hit Evans in the hands, but was knocked out by New England Patriots cornerback Sterling Moore. Two plays later, Billy Cundiff missed a field goal that would have sent the game into overtime, and the Patriots won.

Jacksonville Jaguars
On April 15, 2012, Evans signed a one-year contract with the Jacksonville Jaguars. He was released on August 12, 2012.

Retirement
In 2012, after he was released by the Jacksonville Jaguars, Evans announced his retirement.

References

External links

Buffalo Bills bio

1981 births
Living people
People from Bedford, Ohio
Players of American football from Ohio
American football wide receivers
African-American players of American football
Wisconsin Badgers football players
Buffalo Bills players
Baltimore Ravens players
Jacksonville Jaguars players
Sportspeople from Cuyahoga County, Ohio
21st-century African-American sportspeople
20th-century African-American people